Argentina competed at the 2020 Summer Olympics in Tokyo. Originally scheduled to take place from 24 July to 9 August 2020, the Games were postponed to 23 July to 8 August 2021, because of the COVID-19 pandemic. Since the nation's official debut in 1900, Argentine athletes have competed in every edition of the Summer Olympic Games, except the 1904 Summer Olympics in St. Louis, the 1912 Summer Olympics in Stockholm, and the 1980 Summer Olympics in Moscow because of their support for the United States-led boycott.

Medalists

Competitors
The following is the list of number of competitors in the Games. Note that reserves in field hockey, football, and handball are not counted:

Athletics

Argentine athletes achieved the entry standards, either by qualifying time or by world ranking, in the following track and field events (up to a maximum of 3 athletes in each event):

Track & road events

Field events

Basketball

Men's tournament

Argentina men's basketball team qualified for the Olympics by advancing to the quarterfinal stage as one of the two top-ranked squads from the Americas at the 2019 FIBA World Cup in China.

Team roster

Group play

Quarterfinal

Boxing

Argentina entered three male boxers to compete in each of the following weight classes into the Olympic tournament. With the cancellation of the 2021 Pan American Qualification Tournament in Buenos Aires, Ramón Quiroga (men's flyweight), Mirko Cuello (men's featherweight), and Francisco Verón (men's middleweight) finished among the top five of their respective weight divisions to secure their places in the Argentine squad based on the IOC's Boxing Task Force Rankings for the Americas.

Canoeing

Slalom
With the cancellation of the 2021 Pan American Championships, Argentina accepted an invitation from the International Canoe Federation to send a canoeist in the men's slalom K-1 to the Games, as the highest-ranked eligible nation from the Americas in the federation's international rankings.

Sprint
Argentina qualified a single boat in the men's K-1 1000 m for the Games by finishing ninth overall and seventh among those nations eligible for Olympic qualification at the 2019 ICF Canoe Sprint World Championships in Szeged, Hungary. With the cancellation of the 2021 Pan American Championships, two more boats (men's & women's K-1 200 m) were awarded to the Argentine roster based on the results at the 2019 Worlds.

Qualification Legend: FA = Qualify to final (medal); FB = Qualify to final B (non-medal)

Cycling

Road
Argentina entered one rider to compete in the men's Olympic road race, by virtue of his top 50 national finish (for men) in the UCI World Ranking.

Mountain biking
Argentina qualified one mountain biker for the women's Olympic cross-country race, as a result of her nation's sixteenth-place finish in the UCI Olympic Ranking List of 16 May 2021.

BMX
Argentina received one men's quota spot each for BMX at the Olympics, as a result of the nation's eighth-place finish in the UCI BMX Olympic Qualification List of June 1, 2021.

Equestrian

With Canada's expulsion from the Games over a positive doping test on the female rider, Argentina received an unused berth to send a squad of three equestrian riders into the Olympic team jumping competition by finishing fifth at the 2019 Pan American Games in Lima, Peru.

Jumping

Fencing

Argentina entered one fencer into the Olympic competition. Two-time Olympian María Belén Pérez Maurice claimed a spot in the women's sabre by winning the final match at the Pan American Zonal Qualifier in San José, Costa Rica.

Field hockey

Summary

Men's tournament

Argentina men's field hockey team qualified for the Olympics by winning the gold medal and securing an outright berth at the final match of the 2019 Pan American Games in Lima.

Team roster

Group play

Quarterfinal

Women's tournament

Argentina women's field hockey team qualified for the Olympics by winning the gold medal and securing an outright berth at the final match of the 2019 Pan American Games in Lima.

Team roster

Group play

Quarterfinal

Semifinal

Gold medal game

Football

Summary

Men's tournament

Argentina men's football team qualified for the Olympics by securing an outright berth as the final stage winner at the 2020 CONMEBOL Pre-Olympic Tournament in Colombia.

Team roster

Group play

Golf

Argentina entered one golfer into the Olympic tournament. Magdalena Simmermacher (world no. 399) received a spare berth declined by one of the top 60 original official entrants to compete in the women's event, as the next highest-ranked golfer vying for qualification based on the IGF World Rankings. Emiliano Grillo was initially selected to compete in the men's event but chose not to play.

Gymnastics

Artistic
Argentina entered one artistic gymnast into the Olympic competition. Seventeen-year-old Martina Dominici booked a spot in the women's individual all-around and apparatus events, by finishing seventh out of the twenty gymnasts eligible for qualification at the 2019 World Championships in Stuttgart, Germany. On 23 June 2021, Dominici was reportedly tested positive for a banned substance, while deliberately waiting for the results of her appeal to compete at the Olympics; otherwise, her spot would be allocated to Abigail Magistrati, the nation's next highest-ranked gymnast at the 2019 World Championships.

Women

Handball

Summary

Men's tournament

Argentina men's handball team qualified for the Olympics by winning the gold medal and securing an outright berth at the final match of the 2019 Pan American Games in Lima.

Team roster

Group play

Judo
 
Argentina qualified two judoka (one per gender) for each of the following weight classes at the Games. Remarkably going to her fourth consecutive Games, Paula Pareto was officially selected among the top 18 judoka to defend her title in the women's extra-lightweight category (48 kg) based on the IJF World Ranking List of June 28, 2021, while her fellow Olympian Emmanuel Lucenti (men's half-middleweight, 81 kg) accepted a continental berth from the Americas as the nation's top-ranked judoka outside of direct qualifying position.

Modern pentathlon
 
Argentine athletes qualified for the following spots to compete in modern pentathlon. Sergio Villamayor secured a selection in men's event by winning the bronze medal and finishing among the top two for Latin America at the 2019 Pan American Games in Lima.

Rowing

Argentina qualified one boat in the women's lightweight double sculls for the Games by winning the gold medal and securing the first of three berths available at the 2021 FISA Americas Olympic Qualification Regatta in Rio de Janeiro, Brazil.

Qualification Legend: FA=Final A (medal); FB=Final B (non-medal); FC=Final C (non-medal); FD=Final D (non-medal); FE=Final E (non-medal); FF=Final F (non-medal); SA/B=Semifinals A/B; SC/D=Semifinals C/D; SE/F=Semifinals E/F; QF=Quarterfinals; R=Repechage

Rugby sevens

Men's tournament

Argentina national rugby sevens team qualified for the Olympics by winning the gold medal and securing a lone outright berth at the 2019 Sudamérica Rugby Sevens Olympic Qualifying Tournament in Santiago, Chile.

Summary

Team roster

Group play

Quarterfinals

Semifinals

Bronze medal match

Sailing

Argentine sailors qualified one boat in each of the following classes through the 2018 Sailing World Championships, the class-associated Worlds, the 2019 Pan American Games, and the continental regattas.

Men

Women

Mixed

M = Medal race; EL = Eliminated – did not advance into the medal race

Shooting

Argentine shooters achieved quota places for the following events by virtue of their best finishes at the 2018 ISSF World Championships, the 2019 ISSF World Cup series, the 2019 Pan American Games, and Championships of the Americas, if they obtained a minimum qualifying score (MQS) by 6 June 2021.

Rio 2016 Olympian Federico Gil earned a direct place in the men's skeet for the rescheduled Games as the highest-ranked shooter vying for qualification in the ISSF World Olympic Rankings of 6 June 2021.

Surfing

Argentina sent one surfer to compete in the men's shortboard at the Games. Leandro Usuna secured a spot previously allocated by the defending champion Lucca Mesinas, as the next highest-ranked surfer vying for qualification, following his silver-medal finish at the 2019 Pan American Games in Lima, Peru.

Qualification Legend: Q= Qualified directly for the third round; q = Qualified for the second round

Swimming 

Argentine swimmers further achieved qualifying standards in the following events (up to a maximum of 2 swimmers in each event at the Olympic Qualifying Time (OQT), and potentially 1 at the Olympic Selection Time (OST)):

Table tennis
 
Argentina entered two athletes into the table tennis competition at the Games for the first time since London 2012. Horacio Cifuentes scored the first-stage final triumph for an automatic spot in the men's singles, with his teammate Gastón Alto joining him to hand one of the last three tickets available in the repechage round at the Latin American Qualification Tournament in Rosario.

Taekwondo

Argentina entered one athlete into the taekwondo competition at the Games for the first time since London 2012. 2019 Pan American Games champion Lucas Guzmán secured a spot in the men's flyweight category (58 kg) with a top two finish at the 2020 Pan American Qualification Tournament in San José, Costa Rica.

Tennis

Argentina entered five tennis players (four men and one woman) into the Olympic tournament. Diego Schwartzman (world no. 11), with rookies Facundo Bagnis (world no. 96), Federico Coria (world no. 103), and Francisco Cerúndolo (world no. 117) joining him on the roster after several top 56 original entrants withdrew from the tournament, qualified directly for the men's singles based on the ATP Entry Rankings of 14 June 2021.  Nadia Podoroska secured an outright berth in the women's singles by advancing to the final match at the 2019 Pan American Games in Lima.

Having already qualified in singles, both Bagnis and Schwartzman opted to play together in the men's doubles, along with veteran Horacio Zeballos and his partner Andrés Molteni.

Men

Women

Mixed

Triathlon

Argentina entered one triathlete to compete at the Olympics. Romina Biagioli topped the field of triathletes vying for qualification from the Americas in the women's event based on the individual ITU World Rankings of 15 June 2021.

Volleyball

Beach
Argentina men's and women's beach volleyball teams qualified for the Olympics, by winning the gold medal each at the 2018–2020 CSV Continental Cup Final in Santiago, Chile and in Asuncion, Paraguay.

Indoor
Summary

Men's tournament

Argentina men's volleyball team qualified for the Olympics by securing an outright berth as the highest-ranked nation for pool F at the Intercontinental Olympic Qualification Tournament in Ningbo, China.

Team roster

Group play

Quarterfinal

Semifinal

Bronze medal game

Women's tournament

Argentina women's volleyball team qualified for the Olympics by winning the pool round with three match points and securing an outright berth at the South American Olympic Qualification Tournament in Bogotá, Colombia.

Team roster

Group play

Wrestling

For the first time in 24 years, Argentina entered one wrestler to compete in the men's freestyle 65 kg into the Olympic competition, by progressing to the top two finals at the 2020 Pan American Qualification Tournament in Ottawa, Canada.

Freestyle

See also
Argentina at the 2019 Pan American Games

References

External links 

Nations at the 2020 Summer Olympics
2020
2021 in Argentine sport